Bulgarian National Radio (Bulgarsko natsionalno radio; abbreviated to БНР, BNR) is Bulgaria's national radio broadcasting organisation. It operates two national and nine regional channels, as well as an international service – Radio Bulgaria – which broadcasts in 11 languages.

History
Listening to radio broadcasts from other countries having become popular in Bulgaria by the late 1920s, a group of engineers and intellectuals founded Rodno radio ("Native, or homeland, radio") on 30 March 1930 with the aim of providing Sofia with its own radio station. Broadcasting began in June the same year.

On 25 January 1935, Boris III of Bulgaria signed a decree nationalising Rodno radio and making all broadcasting in Bulgaria a state-organised activity. In early 1936, a new and more powerful medium-wave transmitter sited near Sofia was joined by additional transmitting stations at Stara Zagora and Varna, giving Bulgarian National Radio countrywide coverage, and on 21 May of that year Radio Sofia began broadcasting internationally.

With the merger of EBU and OIRT on 1 January 1993, BNR was admitted to full active membership of the European Broadcasting Union.

Domestic channels

National
Horizont: BNR's most listened-to channel, with round-the-clock news, comment, and music (with the emphasis on modern popular music genres).
Hristo Botev Radio: covering science and the arts, documentaries and discussions on cultural and social questions, drama, classical music, jazz, and programming for children.

Regional

Radio Blagoevgrad
Radio Burgas
Radio Kardzhali
Radio Plovdiv
Radio Shumen
Radio Sofia
Radio Stara Zagora
Radio Varna
Radio Vidin
Radio Bourgas

International
Radio Bulgaria provides news in Bulgarian and also in Albanian, Romanian, English, French, German, Greek, Russian, Spanish, Serbian and Turkish.

Transmission
The domestic channels are broadcast on FM and AM frequencies. Radio Bulgaria broadcasts principally on shortwave plus one medium-wave frequency. All stations are also available online.

On 26 May 2008, RPTS of Kostinbrod in Bulgaria started the country's first regular broadcasts in digital format, using Digital Radio Mondiale (DRM). This signal is also used as the audio channel accompanying BNT's testcard.

Funding
Public service broadcasting in Bulgaria, including BNR, is financed mainly through a state subsidy. The subsidy has to be spent on the preparation, creation and the transmission of the national and regional programmes. Its volume is determined annually on the basis of the average programme production costs per hour approved by the Council of Ministers, regardless of the programme type.

References

External links

 
Bulgarian National Radio at LyngSat Address
Rundfunk und Rundfunkpolitik in Bulgarien (in German)

Eastern Bloc mass media
European Broadcasting Union members
Radio networks
Radio stations established in 1935
Radio stations in Bulgaria
1935 establishments in Bulgaria